Milen Tsvetkov (30 July 1966 – 19 April 2020) was a Bulgarian journalist and television host.

Tsvetkov was born in Sofia. From March 2011 to July 2018, he was the host of his own talk show on Nova Television, titled Milen Tsvetkov's Hour. In 2008, it was announced that he would be the new host of the fourth season of Big Brother (airing on the same channel), replacing former host Niki Kunchev for only one season.

Tsvetkov died at age 53 in a car accident in Sofia which was caused by a driver under the influence of drugs.

References

1966 births
2020 deaths
Journalists from Sofia
Bulgarian television presenters
Entertainers from Sofia
Road incident deaths in Bulgaria